Winterwunderland (English: Winterwonderland) is the second studio album by Schnuffel. It was released on 21 November 2008 by Columbia Records, then re-released on 23 January 2009 (with the only differences between the two versions being a change of text font on the album cover). A Krone-Edition of the album was later released on November 16, 2012.

Track listing

International editions
 2009: Winterwonderland – English version by Snuggle (released only in Australia, Norway and the United Kingdom) with English titles such as "You Make My Heart Sing", "Super Bunny", "Bunny Buddy", "Advent Song", "Today I'm Baking You a Pie", "Bunnies on the Ski Run", "(You Are So Sweet Just Like) Hot Chocolate" and "Sleepy Snuggle".
 2010: Παιχνίδια στο χιόνι (Games in the snow) – Greek version by Σνούφελ το λαγουδάκι (Snoufel the Bunny). Released by Heaven Music, it excludes the tracks "Mein schönstes Geschenk" and "Kuschel Song" (Akustik Version), while adding the bonus track "Zuckersternchen" (which was previously available as the B-side to the single "Schnuffels Weihnachtslied") as the final track. Also, the song "Schnuffels Weihnachtslied" is the first track.

Charts

References

2008 Christmas albums
Christmas albums by German artists
Columbia Records Christmas albums
German-language albums
Pop Christmas albums
Schnuffel albums